Negro Hill is a conspicuous rocky hill, double-peaked with a small tarn in between, rising to 100 m at South Beaches on Byers Peninsula, Livingston Island in the South Shetland Islands, Antarctica. It surmounts Fontus Lake on the south. The area was visited by 19th-century sealers.

The feature was descriptively named (‘Morro Negro’ meaning "Black Hill" in Spanish) by an Argentine Antarctic Expedition in about 1958.

Location

Maps
 Península Byers, Isla Livingston. Mapa topográfico a escala 1:25000. Madrid: Servicio Geográfico del Ejército, 1992.
 L.L. Ivanov et al. Antarctica: Livingston Island and Greenwich Island, South Shetland Islands. Scale 1:100000 topographic map. Sofia: Antarctic Place-names Commission of Bulgaria, 2005.
 L.L. Ivanov. Antarctica: Livingston Island and Greenwich, Robert, Snow and Smith Islands. Scale 1:120000 topographic map.  Troyan: Manfred Wörner Foundation, 2009.

References
 Negro Hill. SCAR Composite Antarctic Gazetteer

Hills of Livingston Island